Darchula District (a part of Sudurpashchim Province, is one of the nine districts of province and one of seventy-seven districts of Nepal. Darchula Lies in the west-north corner of the country.

Etymology
Darchula is made of two words "Dar" (ne:दार) and "Chula" (ne:चुला). Dar means edge (peak) in Dotyali and Chula means fire stove, literally meaning a fire stove made of three stones (or peaks of three hills/mountains). Almost all people in this place used to cook on a fire stove made of three stones. Also, there are mountain peaks here which look like a three-stone fire stove. The legend says that sage Vyasa cooked his food here on a fire stove of three peaks.

History
Darchula was part of Kumaon during Katyuri rule after fall of Katyuris and disintegration of the kingdom, kumaon was divided into numerous small principalities and this region came under the one of the katyuri principality knows as Doti Kingdom, Gorkha annexed Doti in 1790 and made it part of Doti District until 1885. After 1885 it became part of Baitadi District. Baitadi and Dadeldhura had same "Bada-Hakim" (District Administrators) so those two districts used to be jointly called Baitadi-Dadeldhura district, which was formed into a proper Mahakali District after 1956. In 1956 four counties (Thums) of Baitadi were separated and made a sub-district of Mahakali district. From 1956 to 1962 the Mahakali district had three sub-districts: Dadeldhura, Bitadi and Chamba.

In 1962, Chamba separately upgraded to a district and named "Darchula District".

Geography and climate

The district is surrounded by Bajhang District in the east, Baitadi District in the east and the south, Ngari Prefecture of TAR of China in the North and Pithoragarh district of India in the West.

The Himalayan region between two rivers Kali River to Seti River calls Gurans Himal. Darchula district falls in the Gurans Himal zone. Api Himal and Jethi Bahurani are main mountain peaks of the area. Mahakali, Chalune, Tinkar, Nampa and Kalagad are the rivers in the area.

The climate of the area is generally characterized by high rainfall and humidity. The climatic condition varies along with the elevation gradient. The climate of Darchula District varies widely from subtropical to alpine. In the north, most of the parts, having an alpine climate, remain under snow. In the southern part and valleys, the climate is subtropical. Mid- hills have a temperate climate. The average maximum temperature is 18.6 °C and the minimum temperature is 7.7 °C. The average rainfall is 2129mm. Most precipitation falls between May and September.
About eighty percent of the total annual rainfall occurs during the monsoon season (June to September).
A cold, generally dry climate exists in the high alpine valleys just north of the southern arm of the Himalayan mountain range which cuts across the bottom of Darchula.

Major rivers
Mahakali
Chaulani
Tinkar
Nampa
Kalagad

Administration
Darchula District is administered by Darchula District Coordination Committee (Darchula DCC). The Darchula DCC is elected by Darchula District Assembly. The head of Darchula DCC is Mr. Karbir Singh Karki and Mr. Krishna Singh Dhami is deputy head of Darchula DCC.

Darchula District Administration Office under Ministry of Home Affairs co-operate with Darchula DCC to maintain peace, order and security in the district. The officer of District Administration office called CDO and current CDO of Darchula DAO is Sharad Kumar Pokharel

Darchula District Court is a Judicial court to see the cases of people on district level.

Division
The district consists of nine municipalities, out of which two are urban municipalities and seven are rural municipalities. These are as follows:

Former administrative divisions

Formerly, Darchula had one municipality and many VDCs. VDCs were the local administrative units for villages.

Fulfilling the requirement of the new constitution of Nepal 2015, on 10 March 2017 all VDCs were nullified and formed new units after grouping VDCs.

Constituencies

Darchula District consists 1 Parliamentary constituency and 2 Provincial constituencies:

Demographics
At the time of the 2011 Nepal census, Darchula District had a population of 133,274. Of these, 96.1% spoke Doteli, 2.4% Nepali, 0.5% Lepcha, 0.3% Byangsi, 0.3% Darchuleli, 0.1% Magar and 0.2% other languages.

In terms of ethnicity/caste, 64.6% were Chhetri, 16.7% Hill Brahmin, 5.3% Kami, 4.9% Thakuri, 3.1% other Dalit, 1.3% Lohar, 1.3% Sanyasi/Dasnami, 0.7% Byasi/Sauka, 0.7% Damai/Dholi, 0.7% Sarki, 0.1% Badi, 0.1% Magar, 0.1% Tamang, 0.1% Thami and 0.2% others.

In terms of religion, 98.9% were Hindu, 0.9% Buddhist, 0.2% Prakriti and 0.1% Christian.

In terms of literacy, 65.2% could read and write, 2.4% could only read and 32.4% could neither read nor write. 

The number of male 63,609 and female 69,855. Decadal change(%) 9.40, annual growth rate 0.90%, sex ratio (males per 100 females) 91, absent (abroad) population 6,867, where number of male 5,880 and female 987. Total number of house 22,948. Total number of household 25,802. Average household size 5.17. Population density . The town has an Indian counterpart to its northwest, named Dharchula. The split between the two towns is just virtual as the traditions, culture, and lifestyle of the people living across both the regions are quite similar.

More than 56,000 people live in 8,989 households. About 58.4 percent of the population falls below the poverty line.

Economic development
Darchula is one of the least developed districts of the country. The major socioeconomic indicator of Darchula District is still very poor. Life expectancy of these people was about 52 in 1996. About 89.90% of the total population depends upon agriculture. Substance agriculture, lack of basic infrastructure, difficult geophysical condition, traditional agricultural practice, low literacy rate and population growth are the root causes for deeply rooted poverty.

Trade and business
Trade is one of the most important means of livelihood. Every year, people from the hills come with NTFP, ghee, and herbs to sell. Agriculture related commodities are sold in local bazaars (markets). People of Byans, Rapla go to Tibet to fill their needs for clothes and other commodities. Local carpets and wool products, handmade clothes, and NTFP bring in huge amounts of money to the VDCs. However, each and every respondent indicated that their income is invested in domestic use.

Tourism
Api Nampa Conservation Area is a famous gateway to Kailash Mansarobar's holy region located in Tibet. Many pilgrims pass through this Conservation Area to get to Kailash Pravat. Not only Nepalese but also foreigners visit Api Nampa Conservation Area to acquire satisfaction, spirituality and the boons of nature.
The first European, A. H. Savage Landor entered Nampa valley in 1899 and explored the glacier system. He travelled across the Tinkar valley and entered Tibet via the Lipu pass. In 1905, Dr. Longstaff visited this region. Then Swiss geologists A. Heim and A. Gansser visited the Api Himal area in 1936.
The elevation of Api Himal at the top is calculated to be 23,399 ft. John Tyson and W. H. Murray explored this region in 1953. An Api group has been created to lure tourists wanting to see the geological features blending with nature and other natural assets. Sauka culture is also an attraction for tourist.
Api Himal can be visited by going via Darchula Bazar, Huti, Sunsera, Rapla to base camp. It takes five days to reach there or travelers may go via Bitule, Makari Gad, Ghusa Village, Domilla, to Lolu at the base camp. Panoramic views of Himalayas are created by several peaks like Nampa, Jethi Bahurani and others.

Media/radio partners
To Promote local culture there are few FM radio stations: Radio Samad FM 102.6 MHz, Radio Naya Nepal FM 104.5 MHz, Darchula FM, which are Community radio Stations.

Education

Colleges and schools
Darchula Multiple Campus
Gokuleshwar Higher Secondary School
Himalaya Higher Secondary School
Gokuleswar Multiple Campus 
Sri Krishna Snatak Campus
Rastriya Campus
Mahendra Higher Secondary School
Shankarpur Higher Secondary School
Latinath Higher Secondary School
Srikrishana Higher Secondary School
Rastiya Higher Secondary School
Latinatha Higher Secondary School
Hunainath Secondary School Baaj (Mahara Village)
Hunainath Higher Secondary School
Janabikasa Higher Secondary School
Ganesh Binayak Higher Secondary School
Malikarjun Higher Secondary School
Krishana Higher Secondary School
Sarswati Higher Secondary School
Gurilamandu Higher Secondary School
Galainath Higher Secondary School
Satya Parkash Higher Secondary School
Sri Krishana Higher Secondary School
Apinampa Campus

Gallery

References

External links
UN map of VDC boundaries, water features and roads in Darchula
Darchula District On Facebook

See also

 
Districts of Nepal established in 1962